The Spearfish Filling Station, located at 706 Main St. in Spearfish, South Dakota, was built in 1923.  It was listed on the National Register of Historic Places in 1988.

It is a one-story building with five bays: an angled office bay, a shop bay, and three car service bays.  It was built by Alfred J. Sheep, a rancher and businessman, as the first gas station in the community, with the service bays added in 1927.  Sheep operated the station until his death in 1957.

References

Gas stations on the National Register of Historic Places in South Dakota
National Register of Historic Places in Lawrence County, South Dakota
Buildings and structures completed in 1923